The Leeward Islands Gazette was the government gazette of the Leeward Islands, published in Antigua from 1872 until it was replaced by The Antigua, Montserrat and Virgin Islands Official Gazette.

See also
List of British colonial gazettes
List of newspapers in Antigua and Barbuda

References

External links
The Leeward Islands Gazette at The Caribbean Gazettes Digital Collection

British colonial gazettes
Leeward Islands (Caribbean)
Publications established in 1872
Newspapers published in Antigua and Barbuda